Cythnia asteriaphila is a species of sea snail, a marine gastropod mollusk in the family Eulimidae. The species is one of two known species to exist within the genus, Cythnia, the other one is Cythnia albida.

Distribution
This species is mainly distributed off the coasts of America in the Pacific Ocean and the Atlantic Ocean.

References

External links
 To World Register of Marine Species

Eulimidae
Gastropods described in 1864